Nikolai Alexeyevich Epanchin (Russian, Николай Алексеевич Епанчин, 1857 - 1941) was an Imperial Russian division and corps commander. He fought in World War I against the Ottoman Empire.

Awards 
Order of Saint Anna, 4th class, 1878
Order of Saint Stanislaus (House of Romanov), 3rd class, 1878
Order of Saint Anna, 3rd class, 1884
Order of Saint Stanislaus (House of Romanov), 2nd class, 1887
Order of Saint Anna, 2nd class, 1890
Order of Saint Vladimir, 4th class, 1894
Order of Saint Vladimir, 3rd class, 1896
Order of Saint Stanislaus (House of Romanov), 1st class, 1902
Order of Saint Anna, 1st class, 1906
Order of Saint Vladimir, 2nd class, 1910

References 
 Военная энциклопедия Сытина
 Волков С. В. Офицеры российской гвардии. М.: 2002
 Залесский К.А.:Кто был кто в ПМВ
 Список старшим войсковым начальникам, начальникам штабов: округов, корпусов и дивизий и командирам отдельных строевых частей. СПб.: 1913.
 Список Генерального штаба. Исправлен на 01.06.1914. Пг.: 1914.
 Пахалюк К. Боевые действия в Восточной Пруссии в Первую мировую войну. Указатель литературы. 2-е изд. Калининград, 2008
 Епанчин Н. На службе трех императоров. Воспоминания. М.: журнал «Наше наследие» при участии ГФ Полиграфресурсы, 1996. — 576 с. [40] л.и.

External links 
 Биография Епанчина Н. А. на сайте «Хронос»

1857 births
1941 deaths
Russian military personnel of the Russo-Turkish War (1877–1878)
Russian military personnel of World War I
Recipients of the Order of St. Anna, 4th class
Recipients of the Order of Saint Stanislaus (Russian), 3rd class
Recipients of the Order of St. Anna, 3rd class
Recipients of the Order of Saint Stanislaus (Russian), 2nd class
Recipients of the Order of St. Anna, 2nd class
Recipients of the Order of St. Vladimir, 4th class
Recipients of the Order of St. Vladimir, 3rd class
Recipients of the Order of Saint Stanislaus (Russian), 1st class
Recipients of the Order of St. Anna, 1st class
Recipients of the Order of St. Vladimir, 2nd class
Imperial Russian Army generals